Nivea or Nívea is a feminine given name. It may refer to:
 Nivea Hamilton (born 1982), an American singer
 Nívea Maria (born 1947), a Brazilian actress
 Nivea Smith (born 1990), a Bahamian sprinter who specializes in the 200 metres
 Nívea Soares (born 1976), a Brazilian songwriter and singer of gospel music
 Nívea Stelmann (born 1974), a Brazilian actress

See also 
 Nivea (disambiguation)